The 1967–68 Copa del Generalísimo was the 66th staging of the Spanish Cup. The competition began on 1 October 1967 and ended on 11 July 1968 with the final.

First round

|}
Tiebreaker

|}

Round of 32

|}
Tiebreaker

|}

Round of 16

|}

Quarter-finals

|}
Tiebreaker

|}

Semi-finals

|}

Final

|}

References

External links
 rsssf.com
 linguasport.com

Copa del Rey seasons
Copa del Rey
Copa